Larry L. Perkins (born January 8, 1937) was an American politician in the state of Iowa.

Perkins was born in Des Moines, Iowa. He attended the Drake University and was a decorator. He served in the Iowa House of Representatives from 1969 to 1971 as a Republican.

References

1937 births
Living people
Politicians from Des Moines, Iowa
Drake University alumni
Republican Party members of the Iowa House of Representatives